Pak Tea House is an intellectual tea–café located in Lahore, Punjab, Pakistan known for its association with progressive academics and left-leaning South Asian intelligentsia.

Traditionally frequented by country's notably artistic, cultural and literary personalities, it was founded by a Sikh family in 1940 and quickly acquired its current name after it was leased to one of the locals in Lahore after the partition of India in 1947. Intervention of Lahore High Court had led to the re-opening of the Tea House in 2013. Noted for being the birthplace of influential literary movement, the Progressive Writers' Association, the place is described as a hub of Lahore's intellectual life for many years.

History 
The café was set up in 1940 as the "India Tea House" by Boota Singh, a Sikh family in Lahore. In 1944, it was taken over by two Sikh brothers Surtej Singh Bhalla and Kaiser Singh Bhalla. It remained closed during the 1947 partition riots, and in 1948, it was allotted to Sirajuddin Ahmed. Ahmed who renamed it as "Pak Tea House" in 1950 and ran this restaurant successfully from 1948 to 1978. After his death, his son Zahid Hasan managed the cafe and restaurant, but due to reduction in customers, it was closed in 2000. During this period, its ownership was taken over by the Young Men's Christian.

After the independence of Pakistan in 1947, a local food supplier named Sirajuddin Ahmad rented the house from the YMCA administration and renamed it as "Pak Tea House" in 1947. This historic tea house was known as a meeting place and was traditionally frequented by the city's artistic, cultural and literary personalities especially until the 1990s. Attendees included were: Faiz Ahmed Faiz, Agha Shorish Kashmiri, Ibn-e-Insha, Ahmed Faraz, Saadat Hasan Manto, Josh Malihabadi, Sahir Ludhianvi, 
Amrita Pritam, Munshi Premchand, Majrooh Sultanpuri, M. D. Taseer, Krishan Chander, Ismat Chughtai, Ahmad Rahi, Muneer Niazi, Meeraji, Ahmed Nadeem Qasmi, Ahmed Faraz, Habib Jalib, Kaifi Azmi, Kamal Ahmed Rizvi, Nasir Kazmi, Professor Sayyid Sajjad Rizavi, Ustad Amanat Ali Khan, Dr. Muhammad Baqir, Intezar Hussain, Rajinder Singh Bedi, Firaq Gorakhpuri, Shaheer Ahmad Khan and Syed Qasim Mahmood.

Pak Tea House became a birthplace of the influential literary movement, the Progressive Writers' Association in Pakistan, which had been known for left-wing politics since its foundation in 1940. Many writers frequented it, and it was also a favorite gathering place of the section of Lahore youths with non-mainstream points of view. It maintained a reputation as a forum for people of diverse backgrounds to voice their opinions in a non-judgmental atmosphere.

In 1999, it was closed by its owner due to lack of business, a decision criticized by the intellectual community of Lahore. It remained closed for 13 years until 2 February 2012 when, on the orders of the Lahore commissioner, Pak Tea House was again put under the control of the YMCA. On 8 March 2013, Pak Tea House was reinaugurated by the Government of Punjab. Pak Tea House is located on the Mall Road, near Anarkali Bazaar and Neela Gumbad.

In 2014, Pak Tea House is said to be still popular amongst students who reportedly say that the food and snacks are reasonably priced and of good quality. This tea house walls are now decorated with pictures of many literary figures of the past.

Reopening
In June 2012, the government of Punjab announced its intention to reopen the Pak Tea House, where it would support itself. On Friday 8 March 2013, Lahore's iconic Pak Tea House reopened after 13 years of closure. Among the attendees was the Pakistani writer Ata ul Haq Qasmi. Pak Tea House remains a special place for those who remember Lahore's lively literary and cultural past.

See also
 Liberalism and progressivism within Islam
 Progressive Writers' Movement
 Secularism in Pakistan

References

External links
Lahore tea house under threat BBC News

Culture in Lahore
Progressivism in Pakistan
Tea houses
Pakistani literary critics
The Mall, Lahore
Coffeehouses and cafés in Pakistan
YMCA buildings
Restaurants in Lahore